Benjamin Apthorp Gould Fuller (March 9, 1879 in Brookline, Massachusetts – March 15, 1956 in Taxco, Mexico) was a philosopher, author of A History of Philosophy, and president of the American Philosophical Association.  He is also known and published as B.A.G. Fuller.

He was the son of Horace Williams Fuller and Emily Gorham Carter.  He studied at Roxbury Latin School in Roxbury, Massachusetts, and received his B.A., A.M., and Ph.D. from Harvard University in 1900, 1902, and 1906, respectively.  In 1902 he matriculated at Christ Church, Oxford, and received his B.Sc. in 1905.  His Ph.D. thesis on "The Problem of Evil in Plotinus" was published in 1912.  He was described as "a representative of Epicureanism at its best."

Fuller taught philosophy at Harvard from 1906 to 1910.  In 1910 he traveled around the world, visiting Kashmir, northern and central India, Assam, Burma, Java, and Japan, developing "the habit of never taking a ticket further than the next stop, and came to the realization that life is much too short to hurry."

He was commissioned as an infantry captain in the United States Army during World War I and served from 1917 to 1919.  During this time, he was assigned to the staff of General Tasker H. Bliss in the American Section of the Supreme War Council at Versailles from January 1918 to June 1919.  He was awarded the Ordine della Corona d'Italia.

In 1923 Henry Holt & Co. published his History of Greek Philosophy, Thales to Democritus.

He was a professor and fellow at the Graduate School of the University of Cincinnati, where he began teaching in 1924.  He was subsequently a professor of philosophy at the University of Southern California from 1933 to 1941.

Fuller maintained a home in the Hollywood Heights neighborhood of Los Angeles from 1932 until his death.  The house is a Los Angeles Historic-Cultural Monument.  He is buried in Taxco, Mexico, where he had a winter home.

References

External links
Preliminary Inventory of the Benjamin Apthorp Gould Fuller Papers, 1915-1919

1879 births
1956 deaths
Harvard University alumni
American philosophers
University of Southern California faculty
University of Cincinnati faculty
Alumni of Christ Church, Oxford
People from Brookline, Massachusetts
Roxbury Latin School alumni